Bagno di Gavorrano is a small town in Tuscany, central Italy,  administratively a frazione of the comune of Gavorrano, province of Grosseto.

Geography 
Bagno is about 35 km from Grosseto and 3 km from Gavorrano, and it is situated in the plain below the hill of Monte d'Alma, next to the Via Aurelia highway. Bagno, which means bath, was a thermal village until the 1950s.

Main sights 
 San Giuseppe Lavoratore (20th century), main parish church of the village, it was designed by engineer Ernesto Ganelli and consecrated in 1957.

Sports 
The Stadio Romeo Malservisi, which hosts the games of local soccer team U.S. Gavorrano, is situated in Bagno.

References

Bibliography 
 Bernardino Lotti, La sorgente termale del Bagno di Gavorrano in provincia di Grosseto, Bollettino del R. Ufficio Geologico d'Italia, Vol.LVI n.4, Roma, 1931.

See also 
 Caldana
 Castellaccia
 Filare
 Giuncarico
 Grilli, Gavorrano
 Potassa, Gavorrano
 Ravi, Gavorrano

Frazioni of Gavorrano